Wüstegarten is a mountain in the counties of Waldeck-Frankenberg and Schwalm-Eder-Kreis in the north of the German state of Hesse.

The mountain is within the Kellerwald-Edersee National Park, Hesse's only national park. Activities include hiking, nordic walking, mountain biking, and cross-country skiing.

References
 Grieben-Reiseführer: Oberhessen, Kurhessen und Waldeck. Band 230, Karl Thiemig Verlag, Munich, 1981, p. 160.
 Eduard Brauns: Wander- und Reiseführer durch Nordhessen und Waldeck. Bernecker Verlag, Melsungen, 1971, p. 180.
 Karl E. Demandt: Geschichte des Landes Hessen. Johannes Stauda Verlag, Kassel, 1980, pp. 88 and 89

See also

List of mountains of Hesse

Mountains of Hesse
Protected areas of Hesse
Mountains and hills of the Kellerwald